Cayman Islands competed at the 2014 Summer Youth Olympics, in Nanjing, China from 16 August to 28 August 2014.

Medalists
Medals awarded to participants of mixed-NOC (Combined) teams are represented in italics. These medals are not counted towards the individual NOC medal tally.

Athletics

Cayman Islands qualified two athletes.

Qualification Legend: Q=Final A (medal); qB=Final B (non-medal); qC=Final C (non-medal); qD=Final D (non-medal); qE=Final E (non-medal)

Girls
Track & road events

Equestrian

Cayman Islands qualified a rider.

Gymnastics

Artistic Gymnastics

Cayman Islands qualified one athlete based on its performance at the 2014 Junior Pan American Artistic Gymnastics Championships.

Girls

Sailing

Cayman Islands qualified two boats based on its performance at the Byte CII North American & Caribbean Continental Qualifier.

References

2014 in Caymanian sport
Nations at the 2014 Summer Youth Olympics
Cayman Islands at the Youth Olympics